The 1902 Shamakhi earthquake occurred on 13 February with a surface-wave magnitude of 6.9 and a maximum felt Modified Mercalli intensity of IX (Violent). Up to 2,000 people died and thousands more were injured in the Shemakha uezd within the Baku Governorate of the Russian Empire (present-day Republic of Azerbaijan). About 7,439 buildings were damaged or destroyed in the city and surrounding villages. Shamakhi had been devastated by earlier earthquakes in 1806, 1859 and 1872. It is one of the most destructive earthquakes in Azerbaijan.

Impact
The earthquake struck at noon, and Shamakhi was totally destroyed. In addition to the city in ruins, the earthquake also devastated 125 nearby settlements. The destruction of 4,000 homes left 20,000 people homeless. Eight historical mosques, 42 churches, more than 10 madrasas, as well as many commercial buildings and shops were destroyed. In the villages outside the city, over 3,000 houses, many mosques and farmhouses were razed. Damage was made worse by fires started from people cooking; it destroyed many structures that were still standing. The destruction of Shamakhi was attributed to wet soil conditions and building materials which consisted of stones and clay mortar. Damage was light in areas where Christians lived because most homes in these areas were constructed from wood.

See also

 List of earthquakes in 1902
 List of earthquakes in Azerbaijan

References

1902 earthquakes
Earthquakes in Azerbaijan
February 1902 events
1902 in Asia
1902 in the Russian Empire
1902 disasters in the Russian Empire
20th-century disasters in Azerbaijan